Libo Rupilius Frugi (died 101) was a Roman senator and an ancestor of the emperor Marcus Aurelius. He served as suffect consul in 88.

Life
His full name may have been Lucius Scribonius Libo Rupilius Frugi. He was one of the sons and among the children born to Marcus Licinius Crassus Frugi (consul 64) with his wife Sulpicia Praetextata, daughter of the suffect consul in 46, Quintus Sulpicius Camerinus Peticus and a grandson of Marcus Licinius Crassus Frugi, who had been consul in 27 and Scribonia. His brother Gaius Calpurnius Piso Crassus Frugi Licinianus had been a consul in 87. The father of Frugi was executed by the emperor Nero between 66 and 68, because of information brought against him by Marcus Aquilius Regulus. After the death of his father, his mother took him with his siblings, to a Senate meeting in 70 early in the reign of Vespasian, seeking vengeance for his father's death. Regulus and his associates were prosecuted by the Senate.

The Augustan History states that Frugi was of consular rank and refers to him as a former consul. Frugi served as a suffect consul in 88. He has been identified with the ex-consul "Libo Frugi" whom Pliny the Younger reports as speaking aggressively in the Senate concerning the case of Norbanus Licinianus.

Family
Frugi was father of Rupilia Faustina, the paternal grandmother of Marcus Aurelius. Frugi was married to Salonia Matidia, the niece of the emperor Trajan, but that marriage is too late for Salonia to be Faustina's mother. Historians Christian Settipani and Strachan have proposed that Faustina's mother was instead Vitellia Galeria Fundania, daughter of emperor Vitellius.

References

1st-century births
101 deaths
1st-century Roman consuls
2nd-century Romans
Nerva–Antonine dynasty
Rupilii
Scribonii
Suffect consuls of Imperial Rome
Year of birth unknown